Junee Correctional Centre is a prison in Junee, Australia, operated by GEO Group Australia under a contract with the New South Wales state government. The prison houses sentenced male inmates with a maximum, medium or minimum security classification, along with a small number of female remand inmates in transit to other locations. The centre has a capacity of 1200. 

The prison is made up of three sections: a medium-security facility for male inmates, a minimum-security facility for male inmates, and a new maximum-security facility for male inmates, due to open in 2020.

Junee opened in 1993 as the first privately operated prison in NSW.

History
During 1989, representatives of the New South Wales Department of Corrections, including the Minister for Corrective Services, Michael Yabsley, visited the United States to learn first-hand about private corrections management. They toured US state and federal managed corrections facilities as well as privately managed correction facilities. Once satisfied that substantial benefits could be gained from private contract management, coalition support was gained and laws were amended. Instructions went out to government agencies to develop a competitive process to bring private corrections management to New South Wales. It was also decided that to allow for maximum efficiencies in management, the government would also call for tenders for private design and construction of a new
prison.

Following a call to local government authorities for an expression of interest in a privately managed correctional facility being located within local government boundaries, Junee town leaders and the elected representatives strongly supported the concept, and the town was selected as the site for a new correctional centre. The ensuing years saw extensive community consultation by both Corrective Services NSW and NSW Public Works as the government went about selecting an appropriate building contractor and final operator. By 1991, the NSW Government executed a contract with Australasian Correctional Services Pty Limited (ACS) for design and construction, and another contract with the same company for the management of the centre. ACS in turn executed two contracts, one with Thiess Contractors for the design and construction of the facility and one with Australasian Correctional Management Pty Ltd (ACM) for the management of the centre.

The centre, completed in 1993 at a cost of A$53m, was expected upon opening to have a 30 per cent cost saving compared to traditional government prison operations. A special focus of this facility was the establishment of a private industry program to provide employment, valuable skills training and wages to inmates. Two other correctional centres built by the NSW Government at that time, but with each half capacity, were budgeted to cost A$57m each.

New South Wales was the second state in Australia, after Queensland, to introduce private prisons. Junee was the first prison in Australia to be designed, constructed and managed by the private sector under a single contractual arrangement. The prison is managed by the GEO Group Australia, which was granted a new contract in 2001. Following the October 2009 privatisation of Parklea Correctional Centre, Junee is one of two privately operated correctional centres in New South Wales, both operated by GEO Group Australia.

See also

Punishment in Australia

References

GEO Group
Private prisons in Australia
Prisons in New South Wales
1993 establishments in Australia